Danilo Harley Orsi-Dadomo (born 19 April 1996) is an English professional footballer who plays as a striker for EFL League Two side Grimsby Town.

Early and personal life
Born in London, Orsi was raised in Enfield and Barnet. He is of partial Italian and Scottish descent.

Career
Orsi played for Cockfosters before moving to the United States and playing college soccer with Eastern Florida State College (studying business management), scoring 27 goals in 32 games across two seasons, whilst also playing at club level for Chivas U19 and Fort Lauderdale Strikers U23.

Upon his return to England, Orsi played non-league football for East Thurrock United, Hungerford Town, Hampton & Richmond Borough and Maidenhead United. He was Maidenhead's Fans' Player of the Season for the 2020–21 season.

In June 2021 he was linked with a transfer to Football League clubs Burton Albion, Bradford City and Colchester United. Later that month he signed for Football League team Harrogate Town.

On 1 January 2022, Orsi returned to the National League to join Boreham Wood on loan for the remainder of the 2021–22 season. Orsi scored his first goal for the club on his first start as he scored the only goal of the game as his side defeated Wealdstone.

In June 2022 it was announced that he would join Grimsby Town on 1 July 2022.

Career statistics

References

1996 births
Living people
English footballers
Footballers from the London Borough of Camden
Chivas USA players
Fort Lauderdale Strikers players
Cockfosters F.C. players
East Thurrock United F.C. players
Hungerford Town F.C. players
Hampton & Richmond Borough F.C. players
Maidenhead United F.C. players
Harrogate Town A.F.C. players
Boreham Wood F.C. players
Grimsby Town F.C. players
English Football League players
National League (English football) players
Association football forwards
English expatriate footballers
English expatriates in the United States
Expatriate soccer players in the United States
College men's soccer players in the United States
English people of Italian descent
English people of Scottish descent